Peter Roland Loob (born 23 July 1957) is a Swedish former ice hockey player.

Loob, a defenceman, played mostly in the Swedish Hockey League, but has also three appearances in the Swedish national team in the 1983 World Ice Hockey Championships. In 1984 he was drafted for Quebec Nordiques (as the 211th overall draft), where he played eight games, but played most of the 1984–85 season for the Fredericton Express in the AHL and Muskegon Mohawks in the IHL. The next year he returned to Sweden to play for Södertälje SK. He currently lives in Vadstena.

Loob is the older brother of Håkan Loob.

References
 NHL Player Search, Peter Loob.

External links

1957 births
Living people
Färjestad BK players
Fredericton Express players
Muskegon Lumberjacks players
Sportspeople from Gotland County
Quebec Nordiques draft picks
Quebec Nordiques players
Södertälje SK players
Swedish ice hockey defencemen
Swedish expatriate ice hockey players in Canada
Swedish people of Estonian descent